The University Settlement Society of New York is an American organization which provides educational and social services to immigrants and low-income families, located at 184 Eldridge Street (corner of Eldridge and Rivington Streets) on the Lower East Side of the Manhattan borough of New York City, New York. It provides numerous services for the mostly immigrant population of the neighborhood and has since 1886, when it was established as the first settlement house in the United States.

History

University Settlement was founded by Stanton Coit, Charles Bunstein Stover, and Charles Barzillai Spahr, in 1886 as The Neighborhood Guild, in a basement on Forsyth Street.

Historically, the settlement house, much like other settlement houses like Hull House (in Chicago, Illinois) and the Henry Street Settlement (also on the Lower East Side), served as a homes for hundreds of thousands of immigrants who arrived in the United States in the late-19th and early-20th century. They provided courses for new immigrants on everything from politics to the English language to basketball. The University Settlement House also included a library, kindergarten and the first public baths. These settlements were also loci of Progressive Era reform.

When founded, the resident workers at the University Settlement were all male and recent graduates of colleges. Several of these men were writers in addition to settlement house workers and used their writing as social protest and a means of reform.  Residents between 1900 and 1907 included socialist writer William English Walling, a founder of the National Association for the Advancement of Colored People; Pulitzer Prize-winner Ernest Poole; Howard Brubaker, who later became a columnist for The New Yorker; writer Arthur Bullard; journalist Hamilton Holt; and author Walter Weyl, a founding editor of The New Republic. Their interest in reform led to several articles and books on the housing and employment situation of workers on the Lower East Side, particularly women and children.

One issue that captured the imagination of many of the University Settlement writers was revolution in Russia. Many of the immigrants they met on the Lower East Side were Jews from the Russian empire who were typically severely repressed under Nicholas II of Russia. Through their interaction with these immigrants several of the residents became vocal advocates of reform in Russia. During 1905 and 1906, Poole, Walling and Bullard traveled to Russia to cover the abortive 1905 Russian Revolution. They established contacts and helped establish a connection between radical writers in the U.S. and Russian revolutionaries.

During his administration, U.S. President Franklin D. Roosevelt described University Settlement as "a landmark in the social history of the nation."

Legacy 
University Settlement continues to provide support services to residents of the Lower East Side, and now offers programs in 31 locations across Manhattan and Brooklyn. Programs serve New Yorkers of all ages and include child care, pre-school, housing assistance, mental health services, college and career preparation, crisis intervention, activities for seniors, arts events, English classes, after-school programs and summer camps.

Notable alumni and staff 

 Howard Brubaker columnist, The New Yorker

 Nicholas Murray Butler Nobel Peace Prize recipient
 Andrew Carnegie industrialist and businessman
 George Gershwin musician
 Ira Gershwin musician
 Joseph Benson Gilder editor, The New York Times Review of Books
 Samuel Halpert artist
 Hamilton Holt journalist
 Henry Holt publisher
 Seth Low Mayor of New York City
 Pauline Arnoux MacArthur clubwoman, suffragist, librettist
 Clara Pasvolsky concert singer
 Gifford Pinchot Governor of Pennsylvania
 Ernest Poole Pulitzer Prize winner
 Peter Riegert actor
 Eleanor Roosevelt
 Elihu Root Nobel Peace Prize recipient
 Jean Toomer - Author, "Cane"
 Carl Schurz US Senator and Cabinet member
 Jacob Schiff banker and philanthropist
 Barney Sedran Basketball Hall of Famer
 Charles Bunstein Stover New York City Parks Commissioner
 Mary van Kleeck, social feminist
 William English Walling founder, National Association for the Advancement of Colored People
 Walter Weyl author; founding editor, The New Republic
 Jacob Javits American Lawyer, Politician 
Abraham Beame Mayor of New York City
William English Walling American Labor Reformer

See also 

New York Association for New Americans
Settlement and community houses in the United States

References 
Notes

Bibliography
 Davis, Allen (1985, reprint). Spearheads for Reform: The Social Settlements & the Progressive Movement, 1890 to 1914.  New Brunswick: Rutgers University Press.
 Carson, Mina (1990). Settlement Folk: Social Thought and the American Settlement Movement, 1885–1930 University of Chicago Press.
 Scheuer, Jeffrey (1986). Legacy of Light: University Settlement's First Century. New York City: University Settlement.

External links

 universitysettlement.org, the organization's official website

1886 establishments in New York (state)
Buildings and structures on the National Register of Historic Places in Manhattan
Neoclassical architecture in New York City
Education in Manhattan
Educational institutions established in 1886
Educational organizations based in the United States
Lower East Side
Organizations based in New York City
Progressive Era in the United States
Settlement houses in New York City